Pinophilus is a genus of rove beetles in the family Staphylinidae.

Species (list incomplete)

 Pinophilus cayennensis Laporte de Castelnau, 1835 g
 Pinophilus chinensis Bernhauer, 1938 c g
 Pinophilus femoratus Schubert, 1911 c g
 Pinophilus formosae Bernhauer, 1935 c g
 Pinophilus gracilis b
 Pinophilus insigniventris Bernhauer, 1918 g
 Pinophilus javanus Erichson, 1840 c g
 Pinophilus latipes Gravenhorst, 1802 b
 Pinophilus lewisius Sharp, 1874 c g
 Pinophilus melanocephalus Motschulsky, 1858 c g
 Pinophilus parapunctatissimus Li & Chen, 1993 c g
 Pinophilus parcus b
 Pinophilus punctatissimus Sharp, 1889 c g
 Pinophilus rufipennis Sharp, 1874 c g
 Pinophilus sachtlebeni Bernhauer, 1935 c g
 Pinophilus sautteri Bernhauer, 1935 c g
 Pinophilus tenuis Fagel, 1963 g

Data sources: i = ITIS, c = Catalogue of Life, g = GBIF, b = Bugguide.net

References

Further reading

External links

 

Paederinae